Alexandria L. Harden (born May 27, 1993) is an American basketball player for the Phoenix Mercury of the Women's National Basketball Association (WNBA).

College
In the 2015 WNBA Draft, Harden became the first Wichita State Shockers basketball player to be drafted by a WNBA team since Tootie Shaw in 2002. She left as the school's all-time scoring leader with 1,708 points.

Career statistics

Wichita State statistics
Source

WNBA

Awards and honors

College
AP All-America honors
Missouri Valley Conference Player of the Year

References

External links

Wichita State Shockers bio

1993 births
Living people
American women's basketball players
Basketball players from Illinois
Guards (basketball)
Phoenix Mercury draft picks
Phoenix Mercury players
Sportspeople from Springfield, Illinois
Wichita State Shockers women's basketball players
21st-century American women